Hong Kong Taoist Association Tang Hin Memorial Secondary School (abbreviated as THMSS) is a secondary school located in Choi Yuen Estate, Sheung Shui, Hong Kong. It is one of the most famous schools in Hong Kong and it is a band 1 school. It has a good academic result in the DSE exam. The main medium of instruction is English.

The school motto is "Grasp Principles, Cultivate Virtues".

History
The school was established in 1982. It is the second school owned by Hong Kong Taoist Association and it is the first secondary school of the association. At the time it was established, it was a band 5 secondary school with a modest reputation. But after the hard work of previous students, the school progressively made great improvements in examinations and it changed to a band 2 school later in 1997. After that, it has transformed into a band 1 school in 2003. Since then, the school has attained good exam results every year and has been one of the top schools in Hong Kong. Also, it is recognized as the best school in New Territories. In 2007, 2008, and 2015, four students got 10A and 1 got 9 5** results in the Public Examination (HKCE)(HKAL)(HKDSE).

Subjects

Principal
 Mr. Poon Huen Wai (From 1982 to 2007)
 Mr. Lau Chi Yuen (From 2007 to 2020)
 Mr. Wong Shun Tak (From 2020 until now)

Transport
The school is located next to Sheung Shui station, near Choi Yuen bus terminus.

See also
 Taoism
 Tao Te Ching
 Hong Kong Taoist Association

References

External links
 

Sheung Shui
Secondary schools in Hong Kong
North District, Hong Kong